The Costa Rica national cricket team represents Costa Rica in international cricket. The team is organised by the Costa Rica Cricket Federation, which became an affiliate member of the International Cricket Council (ICC) in 2002 and an associate member in 2017. Costa Rica's first recorded international match came in April 2002, when it toured Panama and played against the Panamanian national side. The team's first international tournament was the inaugural edition of the Central American Championships, played in Belize in 2006. It has since regularly fielded teams in that tournament, and also made its debut in ICC Americas tournaments in 2010, at the 2010 Division Four event in Mexico.

In April 2018, the ICC decided to grant full Twenty20 International (T20I) status to all its members. Therefore, all Twenty20 matches played between Costa Rica and other ICC members after 1 January 2019 will be a full T20I.

History

Cricket was introduced in Costa Rica during the late 1800s by Jamaican immigrants coming to construct the country's railways. The sport continued to be played among the Afro-Caribbean population in the Caribbean coastal areas but its popularity began to decline. In recent years, however, more Costa Ricans are being introduced to the game and interest in the game is starting to grow.
 
Costa Rica became an affiliate member of the ICC in 2002. Their first international match was played on 18 March 2006 in the Central American Cricket Championship against Belize to whom they lost. They also lost their game against Mexico finishing third in the tournament.

Costa Rica also took part in the 2007 Central American Cricket Championship, losing to Mexico but recording their first international win against El Salvador and finishing second in the competition.

In 2008, Costa Rica took part in the inaugural Easter Cup, an international Twenty20 tournament, against hosts Nicaragua and El Salvador. Costa Rica dominated the tournament defeating both of the other sides. The second Easter Cup was held in the December of the same year. Costa Rica finished third beating El Salvador but losing to Belize.

The following year, Costa Rica took part in the third Central American Championship, which they also hosted. They finished fourth out of the five participating teams. Their only win in the new Twenty20 format was against El Salvador who they beat by 10 wickets.

The official site for the Costa Rican cricket organisation can be found at http://www.costaricacricket.org

2018-Present
In April 2018, the ICC decided to grant full Twenty20 International (T20I) status to all its members. Therefore, all Twenty20 matches played between Costa Rica and other ICC members after 1 January 2019 will be a full T20I.

Costa Rica played their first ever Twenty20 International match against Panama in 2019 Central American Cricket Championship.

Grounds

Tournament history

Central American Championship
2006: 3rd place
2007: 2nd place
2009: 4th place
2015: 6th place
2019: 5th place 
Easter Cup
Apr 2008: 1st place
Dec 2008: 3rd place

South American Cricket Championship
Aug 2018: 3rd place

Players
Costa Rica's squad for 2019 Central American Cricket Championship from 25-28 April 2019.
 Christopher Prasad (c)
 Oswald Sam Arthur
 Joel Cutinho
 Prajwel Cutinho
 Oscar Fournier
 Nanda Kumar
 Rodrick McClean
 Daniel Mejia
 Gopinath Murali
 Sham Murari
 Sudesh Pillai
 Sachin Ravikumar
 Deepak Rawat
 Esteban Segura Soto
 Zain ul Tashnam

Records

International Match Summary — Costa Rica
 
Last updated 27 April 2019

Twenty20 International 

 Highest team total: 133/7 v. Mexico on 26 April 2019 at Reforma Athletic Club, Naucalpan
 Highest individual score: 46, Joel Cutinho v. Mexico on 26 April 2019 at Reforma Athletic Club, Naucalpan
 Best individual bowling figures: 3/14, Sudesh Pillai v. Mexico on 26 April 2019 at Reforma Athletic Club, Naucalpan

Most T20I runs for Costa Rica 

Most T20I wickets for Costa Rica 

T20I record versus other nations

Records complete to T20I #771. Last updated 27 April 2019.

See also
 Costa Rica women's national cricket team
 List of Costa Rica Twenty20 International cricketers

References

Cricket in Costa Rica
National cricket teams
Cricket
Costa Rica in international cricket